Dennis Schmitt (born 27 May 1993) is a German footballer who plays as a midfielder for Würzburger Kickers II.

References

External links
 

1993 births
Living people
People from Aschaffenburg
Sportspeople from Lower Franconia
German footballers
Association football midfielders
1. FSV Mainz 05 II players
Würzburger Kickers players
Regionalliga players
2. Bundesliga players
Footballers from Bavaria